Xenicus is a genus of birds in the family Acanthisittidae. It contains New Zealand wrens.

Species
New Zealand rock wren, Xenicus gilviventris
Bushwren, †Xenicus longipes (extinct)

Lyall's wren was classified as Xenicus lyalli but is quite divergent, so it is placed in its own genus, Traversia.

References

Catalogue of the genera and subgenera of birds contained in the British museum. p. 31
 North Island Rifleman (Titipounamu)(above two birds) / South Island Bush Wren (Matuhi) (left centre) / Rock Wren (centre right) / Stephens Island Wren by George Edward Lodge. Collection of the Museum of New Zealand Te Papa Tongarewa

 
Taxa named by George Robert Gray
Higher-level bird taxa restricted to New Zealand
Bird genera
Bird genera with one living species